The Coelogyninae are an orchid subtribe in the tribe Arethuseae.

Nothogenera 
Crosses between species in different genera within this subtribe are placed in the following nothogenera (i.e., hybrid genera):
 Coeleione (Coeln.) = Coelogyne × Pleione
 Pleionilla (Plnl.) = Bletilla × Pleione
 Thunilla (Tnl.) = Bletilla × Thunia

See also
 Taxonomy of the Orchidaceae

References

External links

 
Orchid subtribes